Honey is the third studio album by American rock group Open Hand.

Originally released by Anodyne Records in April 2010, a released a remixed, remastered, and re-sequenced version of Honey (featuring a shortened track list) was released for its 10th anniversary by Blacktop Records in April 2020.

Track listing

Original release

2020 re-release

References

Open Hand albums
2010 albums
Anodyne Records albums